The Serbian Orthodox Seminary of Saints Cyril and Methodius, known as the Prizren Seminary (Призренска Богословија), is a Serbian Orthodox theological school. The school has produced scholars and educators, though its main mission is to create clergymen. The seminary was the first cultural-educational and political center of the Serbs in Kosovo.

History

19th century
Serbian merchant Sima Andrejević founded the seminary in order to train men to serve as Orthodox clergymen and teachers. The teaching process in this school started in May 1871. Two years after its foundation, on 10 August 1872, a dormitory for students and another one for professors were added.

20th century
Under the direct leadership of Petar Kostić, it quickly became the center of Serbian culture and education in the Ottoman Empire during the first decades of the 20th century. Located in the center of Prizren, the school soon came to be the cell of a first university in Kosovo, and this enabled the Orthodox, Serb population, to advance educationally and culturally at a time when Albanians were unable to access education, except for some Koran schools in Turkish, for boys only.

The Seminary was looted by Albanians during World War II, when many Serbian churches, monasteries and schools were destroyed. Between 1960–65, the seminary reached its peak and counted 400 students at that time. In 1970 it had 129 students and 12 teachers.

Kosovo War
When the Kosovo War ended, on 12 June 1999, the majority of Serbs who were living in Kosovo at that time, were forced to flee, and those who were unable to, took refuge and hid themselves in the Prizren Seminary, where they were fed and protected by the UN peacekeeping Kosovo Force, until a place for them to settle was found. Serbs hiding in the Seminary were sent for Serbia in August 1999. After the refugee Albanians returned to Prizren, they burned and damaged Serbian buildings, including the Seminary.

2004 unrest
In the 2004 unrest in Kosovo, which broke out on 17 March, ethnic Albanians started attacking the Serb settlement in Prizren, including the Seminary. Reportedly, no UNMIK, Kosovo Police or KFOR were present there at the time to defend the facility. The mob set the seminary on fire, with people inside, and beat several elderly people. One man reportedly died of his injuries.  The German KFOR's failure or refusal to mobilize to protect the Serbs was a main security failures of the 2004 unrest. The UNMIK in Prizren stated that 56 Serb homes and 5 historical churches that were burnt down could have been prevented by KFOR mobilization.

Restoration
In March 2007, the local company HIDROTERM together with Cultural Heritage without Borders (CHwB) worked together in restoring this educational institution to its former state. The tender for its restoration amounted to 1.3 million euros, 20% of which were managed by CHwB, and was supported by the European Agency for Reconstruction. During its restoration, HIDROTERM did the physical work under the supervision of the CHwB. Others who took part in this project were the Municipality of Prizren, the Serbian Orthodox Church, and the Institute for Protection of Monuments in Kosovo. In the summer of 2012, the Russian Orthodox Church decided to donate 200.000 euros to the seminary to prepare for the accommodation of new students.

Directors
 Stevan Dimitrijević, 1899–1903; 1910–1920

Graduates
Patriarch Irinej
Doksim Mihailović, guerrilla fighter
Lazar Kujundžić, guerrilla fighter
Jovan Grković-Gapon, guerrilla fighter
Rade Radivojević, guerrilla fighter

References

Sources

Further reading

External links

Prizren
Religious buildings and structures in Prizren
Seminaries and theological colleges in Kosovo
Educational institutions established in 1871
1871 establishments in the Ottoman Empire
Serbian Orthodox Church in Kosovo
Secondary schools in Kosovo
Education in Prizren
Ottoman Serbia
Kosovo vilayet
Schools in Prizren
Religious schools in Kosovo